Trouble was a subscription television channel operating in the United Kingdom and Ireland that was owned and operated by Virgin Media Television.

Trouble had a key demographic of young adults and teenagers, aged between 15 and 24. The channel aired primarily American and Australian imports, with only a small margin of programmes being British.

Trouble's 1-hour timeshift channel named Trouble +1 (formerly Trouble Reload) closed on 5 February 2009 to make way for the launch of Living2 +1.

History
The idea of Trouble was originally influenced by the now-defunct television channel The Children's Channel's late afternoon scheduling for teen audiences, branded "TCC". When Bravo was revamped in 1997 to become a channel targeting a male audience, Bravo became an evenings and night-time channel, with Trouble occupying its channel space during the day, broadcasting between 12noon and 8pm. The Children's Channel closed down British and Irish operations on 3 April 1998, allowing Trouble to expand as a full-time channel, targeting teenagers and young adults.

Its programming consisted more of popular sitcoms, rather than the cartoons The Children's Channel originally aired. On Sky Digital and NTL, Trouble was in the children's section, due to being a channel aimed at teenage year groups. However, on Telewest, it was in the entertainment section.

Programmes

 3 Non-Blondes
 8 Simple Rules
 Amish in the City
 All About Us
 All of Us
 Batman
 Baywatch
 Beakman's World
 Beautiful People
 Big Wolf on Campus 
 Blossom
 Brookside
 Brotherly Love
 Byker Grove
 California Dreams
 Charmed
 City Guys
 Clueless
 The Cosby Show
 Cuts
 Cutting It
 Dance 360
 Dawson's Creek
 Dead Last
 Desmond's
 Diff'rent Strokes
 Earthworm Jim
 Echo Point
 Eve
 Forever Eden
 Freddie
 Free Ride
 The Fresh Prince of Bel-Air
 Game Over
 Gary the Rat
 Girlfriends
 Grounded for Life
 Half & Half
 Hangin' with Mr. Cooper
 Hang Time
 Happy Hour
 Heartbreak High
 Hollyoaks
 Home and Away
 How I Met Your Mother
 The Hughleys
 In The House
 It's All Relative
 Jesse
 Just Deal
 Kyle XY
 Las Vegas Garden of Love
 Life as We Know It
 Live Through This
 The Loop
 Madison
 Making the Band
 Malcolm & Eddie
 Malibu, CA
 Martin
 Maybe It's Me
 Moesha
 The Monkees
 My So-Called Life
 My Wife And Kids
 No Angels
 Odd Man Out
 One On One
 One World
 Out of This World
 Paradise Hotel
 The Parkers
 Party of Five
 The Princes of Malibu
 Pugwall
 Ready or Not
 The Real World
 The Road to Stardom with Missy Elliott
 Room Raiders
 Run of the House
 The Sausage Factory
 Saved by the Bell
 Saved by the Bell: The College Years
 Saved by the Bell: The New Class
 Scene One
 The Secret Life of Us
 Shipwrecked
 Sk8
 Singled Out
 Sister, Sister
 Spider-Man
 The Steve Harvey Show
 Still Standing
 Summerland
 Swan's Crossing
 Sweat
 Sweet Valley High
 Teachers
 That '70s Show
 The Trap Door
 Trigger Happy TV
 Two Guys and a Girl
 Undergrads
 USA High
 Veronica Mars
 The Wayans Bros
 Weird Science
 Whistler
 Wildfire
 Young Americans
 Zoe, Duncan, Jack and Jane

Closure
On 17 March 2009, Virgin Media Television indicated it would close Trouble and replace it with a version of Living. The channel was closed in April that year after 12 years airing, and was replaced with a two-hour timeshift service of Living titled Living +2.

References

External links
Trouble at TV Ark

Living TV Group channels
Television channels and stations established in 1997
Television channels and stations disestablished in 2009
Defunct television channels in the United Kingdom
1997 establishments in the United Kingdom
2009 disestablishments in the United Kingdom